The Gleadless War Memorial is a Grade-II listed war memorial located on Hollinsend Road at Gleadless, Sheffield. The statue, which depicts a life size sandstone British soldier dressed in a First World War uniform, was put in place during the 1920s.

References

Grade II listed buildings in Sheffield
World War I memorials in England